For information on all Duquesne University sports, see Duquesne Dukes
The Duquesne Dukes football program is the intercollegiate American football team for Duquesne University located in the U.S. state of Pennsylvania. The team competes in the NCAA Division I Football Championship Subdivision (FCS) and is a member of the Northeast Conference.

Duquesne has played football as a club team from 1891–1894, 1896–1903, 1913–1914, and 1920–1928, in the NCAA Division I Football Bowl Subdivision (FBS) from 1929–1942 and 1947–1950, again as a club team from 1969–1978, in NCAA Division III from 1979–1992 and in the NCAA Division I FCS from 1993–present.

The Dukes have won or shared 16 conference championships in the past 26 years.

The team plays its home games at the 2,200-seat Arthur J. Rooney Athletic Field in Pittsburgh, Pennsylvania. The Dukes are coached by Jerry Schmitt.

The Dukes have qualified for the FCS playoffs twice due to an automatic bid for being NEC champions in 2015 at 8-3 (5-1) and again in 2018 at 8-3 (5-1).

History
The Dukes started play in 1891 and have had a continuous program since 1969. They were Northeast Conference co-champions in 2011, 2013, 2016 and 2018 and outright champions in 2015. Previously, Duquesne football was a member of the Metro Atlantic Athletic Conference, winning or sharing 11 conference titles.

Duquesne was the ECAC Bowl champions in both 1995 and 2003. Duquesne was rated #1 in NCAA Division I by the Massey Ratings for the 1941 season and won a NCFA Club National Championship in 1973 after the program was revived in 1969 by then student-athlete Sam Costanzo in cooperation with university administration.

Duquesne is noted for establishing numerous firsts in collegiate football. Former head coach Elmer Layden is credited with devising the system of hand signals that officials use today. The signal system was put to use for the first time on November 11, 1928, when Duquesne hosted Thiel College at Pitt Stadium. Layden was also the first coach to use two sets of uniform jerseys for home and away contests. In 1929, graduate student manager John Holohan conceived the idea of the first night game at Pittsburgh's Forbes Field. On the evening of November 1 that year, the Dukes made history by defeating Geneva College, 27-7, in front of more than 27,000 spectators. This led to the Duquesne Football team's nickname "the Night Riders."

At the club level, Duquesne won the 1973 National Club Football Association national championship at Three Rivers Stadium and was runner-up in 1977.

The Dukes football team also boasts the greatest all-time intraconference winning streak (tied with the University of San Diego) in NCAA Division I FCS history with 39 straight wins in the MAAC. The 39-game streak also ties for the second-longest intraconference winning streak in NCAA Division I Football history, five games shy of the all-time record.

Duquesne defeated Ohio University in the fall of 2021 for the program's first victory over a Football Bowl Subdivision opponent since the divisions were created in 1978.

Conference championships 

† Co-champions

FCS Playoffs results
The Dukes have made two appearances in the FCS Playoffs. Their combined record is 1–2.

Major bowl games 
The Dukes had some success before NCAA college football's alignment into divisions. Duquesne won the 1934 Festival of Palms Bowl and 1937 Orange Bowl.  The Dukes turned down invitations from the Cotton Bowl, Sun Bowl, and Olympic Bowl in 1939.

AP Poll appearances 
From 1933 to 1942, Duquesne was among the elite college football teams in the United States, garnering the sixth-highest winning percentage (71-22-2, .762) in the nation behind Alabama, Tennessee, Duke, Fordham and Notre Dame. In 1941, Duquesne finished the season undefeated and untied, earning a No. 8 Associated Press ranking while leading the nation in scoring defense, rushing defense and total defense. (Duquesne also led all of NCAA Division I football in scoring defense in 2002 and rushing defense, passing defense and total defense in 2005.)

October 19, 1936 #11
November 16, 1936 #20
November 23, 1936 #12
November 30, 1936 #14 FINAL
November 1, 1937 #16
October 23, 1939 #11
October 30, 1939 #13
November 6, 1939 #12
November 13, 1939 #10
November 20, 1939 #20
November 27, 1939 #6
December 4, 1939 #10
December 11, 1939 #10 FINAL
October 27, 1941 #16
November 3, 1941 #12
November 10, 1941 #10
November 17, 1941 #6
November 24, 1941 #5
December 1, 1941 #8 FINAL
October 12, 1942 #13

Notable players
Leigh Bodden
Art Rooney
Aldo Donelli
Mike Basrak
Boyd Brumbaugh
Ernie Hefferle
Christian Kuntz
Armand Niccolai
Nick DeCarbo
Al DeMao
Ray Kemp
Tony Zimmerman

References

External links
 

 
1891 establishments in Pennsylvania
American football teams established in 1891